The CURE Insurance Arena is a multipurpose arena in Trenton, New Jersey. It hosts events including shows, sporting events and concerts.

The arena seats 7,605 for hockey and other ice events, 8,600 for basketball and up to 10,500 for concerts, family shows, and other events which makes it the largest arena in Central New Jersey. The arena is located next to, and served by, the Hamilton Avenue station on NJ Transit's River Line and New Jersey Route 129.

It is managed by Philadelphia-based Spectra, a subsidiary of Comcast Spectacor.

History and events
The arena opened as Sovereign Bank Arena on October 6, 1999, with a World Wrestling Entertainment event. On November 13, 2009, Sun National Bank signed a naming-rights deal for seven years for $2.1 million. Since the arena opened, it has hosted over 1200 events with over 4 million guests attending and has sold out shows by Bruce Springsteen, World Wrestling Entertainment (WWE), Shania Twain, Keith Urban, Cher, Elton John, Ringling Bros. and Barnum & Bailey Circus, Britney Spears and Justin Bieber among others. Musical events have dwindled in the 2010s.

CURE Insurance Arena hosted the last regular season games of the premier 2018 JBA season.

Professional Box Lacrosse
The Trenton Terror of the Professional Box Lacrosse Association is part of the eight-team inaugural season. The Terror held their first game on December 30, 2022, against the New England Chowderheads, in which they lost 15-16 in overtime.

Men's college basketball
The 2000 and 2001 Northeast Conference men's basketball tournaments were held there, as was the 2003 Metro Atlantic Athletic Conference men's basketball tournament.

Women's college basketball
In 2006, the arena hosted the first and second rounds of the NCAA Women's Division I Basketball Tournament.  In 2009, the arena hosted the Trenton Regional of the NCAA Women's Division I Basketball Tournament where the University of Connecticut went to the Women's Final Four.

Men's club hockey
In 2021, The College of New Jersey's club ice hockey program announced it would play five home games at the arena during the 2021–22 season. Later on this increased with the non-varsity team using the arena as a home venue to finish the regular season. As defending conference champions, the Lions hosted the 2022 Colonial Cup Playoffs at the arena and reached the championship game before falling to the top seeded University of Pennsylvania.

References

External links
 
 RinkAtlas listing for CURE Insurance Arena

1999 establishments in New Jersey
Basketball venues in New Jersey
Buildings and structures in Trenton, New Jersey
College basketball venues in the United States
College ice hockey venues in the United States
Indoor ice hockey venues in the United States
Indoor lacrosse venues in the United States
Sports in Trenton, New Jersey
Tourist attractions in Trenton, New Jersey
Sports venues completed in 1999
Indoor arenas in New Jersey